Blosser Municipal Airport  is two miles south of Concordia, in Cloud County, Kansas, United States. The airport was named after Charles H. Blosser, a longtime Concordia resident, aviation enthusiast, and former city mayor. It is on land originally owned by the Blosser family.

Facilities

In the year ending July 24, 2007 the airport had 14,550 aircraft operations, average 39 per day: 97% general aviation and 3% military. Nine aircraft were then based at the airport: eight single-engine and one ultralight.

History 
In 1930, Charlie Blosser laid the first dirt airstrip on his farm. He later donated the land to the city for airport use.

Gallery

References

External links

Airports in Kansas
Buildings and structures in Cloud County, Kansas
Articles containing video clips